Roberto Abenia Uliaque (born 8 November 1972, in Zaragoza) is a goalball athlete from Spain.   He played goalball at the 1996 Summer Paralympics. His team was third.  He played goalball at the 2000 Summer Paralympics. His team was third.  He played goalball at the 2004 Summer Paralympics. His team was six.

References 

Paralympic goalball players of Spain
Living people
1972 births
Paralympic bronze medalists for Spain
Sportspeople from Zaragoza
Goalball players at the 1996 Summer Paralympics
Goalball players at the 2000 Summer Paralympics
Goalball players at the 2004 Summer Paralympics
Medalists at the 1996 Summer Paralympics
Medalists at the 2000 Summer Paralympics
Paralympic medalists in goalball